Jesper Christensen (born 16 May 1948) is a Danish actor. A veteran of European cinema, he has more recently made the transition to English language projects, including The Interpreter and Revelations. He has also appeared as the mysterious villain Mr. White in the James Bond films Casino Royale, Quantum of Solace, and Spectre.

In his home country, Christensen has won four Bodil Awards, three for Best Actor: Did Somebody Laugh? (1978), The Bench (2000), and Manslaughter (2005), and one for Best Supporting Actor: Barbara (1997).

In 2006, Jesper Christensen declined the offer to receive the Knight's Cross of the Order of the Dannebrog. He said that he thought the entire idea of monarchy is a crime against the members of the royal family, and it does not fit with modern ideas.

Filmography

Film

References

External links
 
Official website

1948 births
Danish male film actors
Living people
Best Supporting Actor Guldbagge Award winners
Best Actor Bodil Award winners
21st-century Danish male actors
20th-century Danish male actors
Male actors from Copenhagen
Best Actor Robert Award winners